Ed Gaughan is a director, comedian, actor, voice actor and jazz musician. He is best known for his starring role in the BAFTA-nominated 2010 film Skeletons and for voicing Baron von Greenback in Danger Mouse and Q Pootle 5 in Q Pootle 5.

Career
He grew up in Barnstaple and went to Pilton Community College.

2000-2010 he formed a standup comedy double-act with Andrew Buckley.

He was nominated for The Peter Sellers Award For Comedy in 2011 for his role in the film Skeletons.

Gaughan has been a voice over artist since 2007. His most famous roles include Q Pootle 5 on CBeebies and Baron von Greenback in Danger Mouse on CBBC.

Acting roles in movies have included Hummingbird and Fantastic Beasts: The Crimes of Grindelwald.

He played guitar for the album Let's Do It - Jazz Classics With a Twist with Danusia Samal.

References

External links

Living people
English male voice actors
Year of birth missing (living people)
21st-century English male actors
Place of birth missing (living people)